Island Bend Dam is a major ungated concrete gravity dam with a controlled spillway across the Snowy River in the Snowy Mountains region of New South Wales, Australia. The dam's main purpose is for the diversion of water for generation of hydro-power and is one of the sixteen major dams that comprise the Snowy Mountains Scheme, a vast hydroelectricity and irrigation complex constructed in south-east Australia between 1949 and 1974 and now run by Snowy Hydro.

The impounded reservoir is called the Island Bend Pondage.

Location and features
Completed in 1965, Island Bend Dam is a major dam, located within the Snowy Monaro Regional Council, adjacent to the locality of Island Bend. The dam was constructed by Utah Construction and Engineering Pty Limited based on engineering plans developed under contract from the Snowy Mountains Hydroelectric Authority.

At 100% capacity the dam wall holds back  of water. The controlled spillway is capable of discharging .

The dam receives water from Lake Jindabyne and Lake Eucumbene through the Snowy-Island Bend and Snowy-Eucumbene tunnels respectively. The combined water is then sent West through the Snowy-Geehi trans-mountain tunnel to Geehi Dam for generation in the Murray Power Stations. Water can flow the reverse direction, to Eucumbene and Jindabyne from Geehi for storage during periods of high river flow, or otherwise.

Climate

See also

 Kosciuszko National Park
 List of dams and reservoirs in New South Wales
 Snowy Hydro Limited
 Snowy Mountains Scheme
 Snowy Scheme Museum

References

External links
 

Snowy Mountains Scheme
Gravity dams
Dams in New South Wales
Dams completed in 1965
Kosciuszko National Park
Murray-Darling basin